Four corners of the world is a portrayal of the four compass points in several cosmological and mythological systems.

Four corners of the world may also refer to:

 Four continents, a 16th-century European view of the globe
 4 Corners of the World, label on the logo of Four Corners Records
 The Four Corners of the World, a 1917 short-story collection by A. E. W. Mason
 Ad quattuor cardines mundi ("to the four corners of the earth"), motto of St Cross College, Oxford
 Four Corners of the World, a 1958 album by Juan García Esquivel
 Four Corners Of The World, Chapter 098 of DJ Screw's official Screwtape mixtape series
 The Four Corners of the World, a musical work for brass ensembles by Ronald Hanmer
 "The Four Corners Of The Earth", a song on the 1992 album Difficult Loves by Weddings Parties Anything
 "At the Four Corners of the Earth", a track on the 1997 album The Divine Wings of Tragedy by Symphony X

See also
Four Corners (disambiguation)
The fourth part of the world (disambiguation)